Vincenzo Santopadre (born 11 August 1971) is a former professional tennis player from Italy.

Since 2011, he has been the coach of Matteo Berrettini, who has been ranked number 6 ATP, runner-up at Wimbledon, semifinalist at the US Open and the third Italian tennis player in history to have qualified for the ATP Finals.

Career
Santopadre reached a career high World No. 100 on 3 May 1999. He won one doubles title and achieved a career-high doubles ranking of world no. 103 on 24 August 1998. At the Rome Masters, Santopadre achieved victories over 10th seed Karol Kucera in 1998 and defending champion Magnus Norman in 2001.

He reached the semifinals of Bournemouth in 1998 and the quarterfinals of Chennai and Munich in 1999, defeating Gustavo Kuerten in the latter. He is the son-in-law of former Poland international footballer Zbigniew Boniek.

Career finals

Doubles (1 title, 1 runner-up)

References

External links
 
 

1971 births
Living people
Italian male tennis players
Tennis players from Rome
Mediterranean Games gold medalists for Italy
Mediterranean Games medalists in tennis
Competitors at the 1997 Mediterranean Games